Bramhapuri is a town and municipal council in Chandrapur district in the state of Maharashtra, India.

Geography
The town is located in the 73rd Vidhan Sabha constituency in Maharashtra.

Demographics
According to 2011 Indian census, Brahmapuri Municipal Council administers over 8,575 households composing a population of 36,025. Male population constitute 50.10% of the total population and females 49.90%.  The population of children with an age of 0 to 6 is 3,283, which is 9.11 % of the total population of Brahmapuri. 

In Brahmapuri Municipal Council, the female sex ratio is of 996 against the state average of 929. The child sex ratio in Brahmapuri is around 990 compared to the Maharashtra state average of 894. The literacy rate of Brahmapuri city is 89.69 % higher than state average of 82.34 %. In Brahmapuri, male literacy is around 93.55 % while the female literacy rate is 85.82 %.

73% of the population follows Hinduism and 21% population follows Buddhism. Muslims account for around 4.5%, Christians 0.5%, Sikhs 0.37%, Jains 0.19% and others 0.42%.

History
Bramhapuri was a city in the Satavahana dynasty, with many burnt-brick houses, numerous glass beads and coins. Many bronze objects were excavated from there, many of which are Indian but few were also of Roman and Italian origin, that can be attributed to the Satavahana period.

Climate
The climate here is generally hot and dry whereas in the rainy season it is humid and the rainfall is quite heavy. The temperature in summer goes above 45 °C and in winter drops below 10 °C. In the last few years this town has been listed among the top five hottest cities of India.

References

Cities and towns in Chandrapur district